Bruce Taylor may refer to:

Bruce Taylor (Australian cricketer) (1924–1984), Australian cricketer
Bruce Taylor (New Zealand cricketer) (1943–2021), New Zealand cricketer
Bruce Taylor (American football) (born 1948), American football player
Bruce Taylor (poet) (born 1960), Canadian poet
Bruce Taylor (baseball) (born 1953), former Major League Baseball pitcher